Ann Mahoney (born April 24, 1976) is an American television and film actress notable for her role as Olivia in The Walking Dead.

Biography 
Born in Rochester, New York, Mahoney moved with her family at the age of two to New Orleans, Louisiana, when her father was accepted to teach at Loyola University. She attended Riverdale High School and went on to take theater studies at Greensboro College and University of Connecticut, where she obtained a master's degree. She currently teaches in New Orleans at Loyola University.

Mahoney's most notable roles are Olivia on The Walking Dead, Beth on Rectify, and Gladys Presley on the forthcoming Sun Records.

Filmography

Film

Television

References

External links 
 

American film actresses
American stage actresses
American television actresses
Living people
University of Connecticut alumni
Actresses from New Orleans
Actresses from Rochester, New York
1976 births
21st-century American women